George Michalakis is a South African attorney of the High Court and politician who serves as a Delegate of the National Council of the Provinces for the Free State and is a party member of the Democratic Alliance. Michalakis previously served as a Councillor for the Lejweleputswa District Municipality from 2011-2014.

Life and career
Michalakis was born in the Free State town of Winburg in January 1988.  He completed his matric year at the Winburg High School in 2006 and went on to study an LLB and BA Honours in French at the University of the Free State.  Michalakis worked for the Schoeman Maree inc law firm from 2012 to 2014.

References

External links

Members of the National Council of Provinces
Democratic Alliance (South Africa) politicians
People from the Free State (province)
1988 births
Living people